Aisin Gioro Chong'an (崇安; 5 September 1705 – 14 October 1733) was Qing dynasty imperial prince as Chuntai's fourth son and sixth-generation descendant of Daišan, Nurhaci's second son. Chong'an was the third Prince Kang of the First Rank before his peerage was renamed back to "Prince Li of the First Rank" in commemoration of Daishan's contribution to establishment of the Qing dynasty.

Life 
Chong'an was born on 5 September 1705 to lady Irgen Gioro, Chuntai's secondary spouse. Chong'an inherited father's princely title on 20 June 1709, having barely been 4 years old. As a prince Kang of the First Rank, Chong'an became the general commander of the Manchu Plain Red Banner.In 1725, Chong'an and other ministers charged Yunsi with litany of 40 crimes, including attempt of usurpation of the imperial throne through creation of the "Eight Lord Party". Those accusations led to Yunsi's banishment from the imperial clan and condemnation of his supporters.

Chong'an was furthermore entrusted with affairs of the Imperial Clan Court, which happened in 1727. In 1731, Chong'an commanded the defence of Guihua city from Dzungars. When the defence failed, Chong'an was appointed as a generalissimus of Eight Banners force. Shortly after receiving the seals, Chong'an was summoned back to the capital. He died of injuries during the battle on 14 October 1733 and was posthumously honoured as Prince Kangxiu of the First Rank.

Family 
Chong'an was married to lady Magiya, daughter of duke Zhongda Malishan (马礼善).

 Primary consort, lady Magiya
 Secondary consort, of the Sirin Gioro clan
 Kuifu (魁福,1724–1725)
 Prince Ligong of the First Rank Yong'en (永恩; 12 September 1727 – 10 April 1805), second son
 Secondary consort, of the Irgen Gioro clan (侧福晋伊尔根觉罗氏)
 Prince Li of the First Rank Yongkui (永奎, 1729 – 28 March 1790), third son

References 

Qing dynasty imperial princes
Prince Li